Transport standards organisations is an article transport Standards organisations, consortia and groups that are involved in producing and maintaining standards that are relevant to the global transport technology, transport journey planning and transport ticket/retailing industry. Transport systems are inherently distributed systems with complex information requirements. Robust modern standards for transport data are important for the safe and efficient operation of transport systems. These include:

Formal standards development organisations;
Other international bodies developing definitive core specifications;
Other important international bodies;
Other National bodies developing definitive core specifications;
Other important National bodies

Formal standards development organisations 
The formal development of international standards is organised in three tiers of Standards Development Organisations, recognised by international agreements :

 World: International Organization for Standardization, ISO. International Electrotechnical Commission (IEC)
 Regional Regional Standards bodies coordinate standardisation between geographically or politically connected regions with a need to harmonise products and practices. For example, in Europe, the European Committee for Standardization or CEN
 National, e.g. Most Nations have a coordinating body responsible for organizing participation in CEN & ISO activities, for publishing ISO & CEN standards within the country, and for coordinating national standardisation activities. The National SDO in turn will delegate responsibility as appropriate to the relevant trade associations, government departments and other stakeholders for a specific are of technical expertise.  For example, in the UK the  British Standards Institution or BSI is the National SDO.

The SDOs conduct their work through a system of working groups, responsible for different areas of expertise. These evolve over time to accommodate changes in technology. key current working groups for transport standards are outlined below.

CEN Working Groups and leaders for Transport Standards
CEN Allocates responsibility for different areas of transport standardisation to working groups

 WG1 -	Automatic Fee Collection and Access Control	-CEN
 WG2 - Freight and Fleet Management System	- ISO
 WG3 - Public Transport	- ISO
 WG4 -	TTI – Traffic and Traveller Information -	ISO
 WG5 -	TC - Traffic Control -	ISO
 WG6 -	 Parking Management -	n/a
 WG7/8 - Geographic Road Data Base: Road Traffic Data -	ISO
 WG9 -	Dedicated Short Range Communications -	CEN
 WG10 - Man-machine Interface -	n/a
 WG11 - Subsystem- Intersystem Interfaces -	ISO
 WG12 - Automatic Vehicle and Equipment Identification -	CEN
 WG13 - System Architecture and Terminology -	ISO

ISO Working Groups and leaders for Transport Standards

ISO Technical Committee 204 is responsible for Transport Information and Control Systems. It has a number of standing Working Groups, which set up Subgroups from time to time.

Current ISO TC204 Working Groups, Work program & Countries that provide Secretariat are as follows

 WG1	Architecture	- UK
 WG2	Quality and Reliability Requirements	- Japan
 WG3	TICS Database Technology	- Japan
 WG4	Automatic Vehicle Identification	- Norway
 WG5	Fee and Toll Collection	Holland
 WG7	General Fleet Management and Commercial and Freight	- Canada
 WG8	Public Transport/Emergency	- America
 WG9	Integrated Transport Information, Management, and Control	- Australia
 WG10	Traveller Information Systems	- UK
 WG11	Route Guidance and Navigation Systems	- Germany
 WG14	Vehicle/Roadway Warning and Control Systems	- Japan
 WG15	Dedicated Short Range Communications for TICS Applications	- Germany
 WG16	Wide Area Communications/Protocols and Interfaces	- America

For an up-to-date schedule of the remit of TC204, its current Working Groups and their points of contact please refer to:

The U.S. standards developing organization which is tasked with the domestic implementation of ISO TC204 Transport Standards, is the Telecommunications Industry Association.

Other international bodies developing definitive core specifications
As well as the formal SDOs, a number of other international bodies undertake work that is important for Transport and Transport Information standards

International Air Transport Association (IATA)
International Union of Railways (UIC)
Institute for Transportation and Development Policy (ITDP) which develops the BRT Standard
European Broadcasting Union (EBU) - See TPEG
World Wide Web Consortium (W3C)
OpenTravel Alliance (OTA)
Open Geospatial Consortium (OGC)
Organization for the Advancement of Structured Information Standards (OASIS)
railML.org Railway data standardisation body defining railML

Other important international bodies
Object Management Group (OMG)
EuroRoadS
Media Oriented Systems Transport (MOST)
European Railway Agency (ERA)

National bodies developing definitive core specifications

German organisations active in Transport Standards development 
Verband Deutscher Verkehrsunternehmen (VDV)

UK organisations active in Transport Standards development

UK bodies developing definitive core specifications
Department for Transport (DfT)
Ordnance Survey (OS)
Rail Settlement Plan (RSP)
National Rail Enquiries (NRE)
Integrated Transport Smartcard Organisation (ITSO)
UTMC Development Group (UDG)
Real Time Information Group (RTIG)
Travel Information Highway (TIH)

Other important UK bodies and initiatives
Transport for London
National Traffic Control Centre (NTCC)
Association of Transport Operating Officers (ATCO)
Royal National Institute of Blind People (RNIB)
Royal National Institute for Deaf People (RNID)
Journey Solutions
Oyster card

US bodies developing definitive core Transit Standard specifications
National Transportation Communications for Intelligent Transportation System Protocol or NTCIP

See also
Standards organisations

References

 Catalogue of standards for travel information and retailing. March 2007 CC-PR149-D005-0.6  UK Department of Transport

Information systems
Travel technology
Standards organizations
Transport organizations